"Train" is the second rock single from 3 Doors Down's, self titled fourth studio album. The song was released as a rock radio only promo on May 19, 2008, and was one of the most added tracks. The demo version appears on the deluxe edition of the band's 2011 album Time of My Life.

Charts
"Train" debuted at No. 33 on the Mainstream Rock chart and peaked at No. 10. It reached No. 29 on the Modern Rock Tracks chart. It is their ninth top 10 single on the Mainstream Rock chart.

References

3 Doors Down songs
2008 singles
2008 songs
Songs written by Brad Arnold
Songs written by Matt Roberts (musician)
Songs written by Todd Harrell
Songs written by Chris Henderson (American musician)
Song recordings produced by Johnny K
Universal Records singles
Songs about trains